Collinstown is a townland in Fingal, roughly 7 km north of Dublin in Ireland. This administrative land area is in the civil parish of Santry, within the barony of Coolock, in the traditional County Dublin.  

The townland is entirely within the perimeter of Dublin Airport, which grew out of Collinstown Aerodrome, originally a Royal Air Force station.  In the Irish War of Independence the aerodrome was converted to become Collinstown Camp, used for internment of Irish republicans. Construction of the airport followed, and it expanded over time, spreading into neighbouring administrative areas.

References

Townlands of Fingal